Āndhra was an ancient Dravidian tribe of south-central Indian subcontinent whose existence is attested during the Iron Age.

Location
The Āndhras lived around the deltas of the Godāvarī and Kṛṣṇa rivers, and their neighbours to the north was the Indo-Aryan Kaliṅga kingdom.

The political centre of the Āndhras was Andhapura, or Dhaññakaḍa, which corresponds to modern-day Vijayawada.

History
The Āndhras were the ancestors of the present-day Telugu people.

References

Further reading

Ancient peoples of India